11th Street or Eleventh Street may refer to:

 11th Street station (Indiana), a street stop in Michigan City, Indiana
 11th Street station (SEPTA), a subway station in Philadelphia, Pennsylvania
 Eleventh Street station (Miami), a Miami Metromover station
 Museum Campus/11th Street station, a commuter rail station
 11th Street Bridge in Tulsa, Oklahoma
 11th Street Bridges in Washington, D.C.